The Mathews Petit Breezy is an American ultralight aircraft that was designed by Lyle Matthews in conjunction with his partners Al Petit and Kindall and Wink Turner. It was made available in the form of plans for amateur construction. The aircraft was inspired by the larger RLU-1 Breezy.

Design and development
It features a strut-braced high-wing, a single-seat, open cockpit, tricycle landing gear and a single engine in pusher configuration.

The aircraft is made from riveted aluminum tubing, with the wings and tail covered in doped aircraft fabric. Its  span wing is supported by V-struts with jury struts. The wing features half-span ailerons. The tail is a strut-braced cruciform tail. The fuselage consists of an aluminum keel tube that runs from the nose wheel to the tail. The pilot is accommodated on an open seat mounted to the main keel tube and a second seat can be fitted under the wing.

In 2011 plans were still available for the design from the Vintage Ultralight Association. Construction time from the plans is estimated at 200–300 hours

Specifications (Petit Breezy)

See also

References

External links
Photo of Mathews Petit Breezy

Petit Breezy
1980s United States ultralight aircraft
Homebuilt aircraft
Single-engined pusher aircraft